Chen Cheng-jia is a Taiwanese politician. He currently serves as the Administrative Deputy Minister of the Council of Indigenous Peoples of the Executive Yuan. He is a Han Chinese.

Education
Chen obtained his master's degree from the City University of Seattle in the United States.

Career
Chen began his public service career as a junior civil servant. He supervised and promoted programs to benefit Taiwanese aborigines. He was appointed Administrative Deputy Minister of the Council of Indigenous Peoples on 22 October 2013.

See also
 Taiwanese aborigines

References

1960 births
Living people
Government ministers of Taiwan